Patina is a young adult novel by Jason Reynolds, published August 29, 2017 by Atheneum. It is the second book in Reynold's Track series, preceded by Ghost (2016) and followed by Sunny (2018) and Lu (2018).

Patina is a New York Times best seller and Junior Library Guild book.

Reception 
Patina is a New York Times best seller and Junior Library Guild book.

The book received starred reviews from Booklist, The Horn Book, and Kirkus, as well as positive reviews from Bulletin of the Center for Children’s Books and Shelf Awareness.

Reviewers called Patina "stellar," as well as "complete, complex, and sparkling."

Shelf Awareness's Siân Gaetano complimented Reynolds creation of the book's main character, Patina, stating, "It is simply impossible to not love Patina ...  Charming, hardworking and a dedicated sister, runner and student, Patina is a sympathetic and wholly sympathetic character who finds her own peace by learning to work with others."

The Chicago Public Library, Los Angeles Public Library, Kirkus, and Horn Book named Patina one of the best young adult books of 2017. School Library Journal and The New York Times named it one of the best middle grade chapter books of the year.

References 

2017 children's books
Atheneum Books books
Books by Jason Reynolds